"April Love" is a popular song with music by Sammy Fain and lyrics by Paul Francis Webster. It was written as the theme song for a 1957 film of the same name starring Pat Boone and Shirley Jones and directed by Henry Levin.

Helped by the release of the film, "April Love" became a number-one hit in the United States for Pat Boone, and spent twenty-six weeks on the US pop charts (it spent 6 weeks at number 1). In 1958, it was nominated for an Oscar for Best Music, Original Song but lost out to “All the Way”.

Other recordings
 Connie Francis - for One for the Boys.
 Jane Morgan - included in the album Jane Morgan Sings the Great Golden Hits (1961).
 Johnny Mathis - Tender Is the Night (1964)
 Billy Vaughn
 Artie Malvin with Jimmy Carroll & His Orchestra - Bell BS-128 (1957, Australia)

See also
List of number-one singles of 1957 (U.S.)
List of number-one singles in Australia during the 1950s

References

External links

1957 singles
Dot Records singles
Pat Boone songs
Number-one singles in the United States
Number-one singles in Australia
Songs written for films
Songs with lyrics by Paul Francis Webster
Songs with music by Sammy Fain
1957 songs